The 1974 Utah Utes football team was an American football team that represented the University of Utah as a member of the Western Athletic Conference (WAC) during the 1974 NCAA Division I football season. In their first season under head coach Tom Lovat, the Utes compiled an overall record of 1–10 with a mark of 1–5 against conference opponents, placing seventh in the WAC. Home games were played on campus at Robert Rice Stadium in Salt Lake City.

Schedule

NFL Fraft
Two Utes were selected in the 1975 NFL Draft, which lasted 17 rounds (442 selections).

References

Utah
Utah Utes football seasons
Utah Utes football